Naznin Hasan Chumki is a Bangladeshi television and film actress. She is also a scriptwriter, director and anchor. In 2006, she won the National Film Award for Best Actress for the film Ghani (2006). She is a joint general secretary of the Actors Equity.

Early life
Naznin Hasan Chumki grew up in Chuadanga, in the western part of Bangladesh, before moving to the capital city of Dhaka in 1996 to attend university and pursue acting. She enrolled at Jagannath College (now Jagannath University) in night shift and threw herself into acting by day. At Jagannath College, she joined "Desh Theatre Group".

Career
In 1999, Chumki made her debut on television in the play Parijat and the serial Jete Jete Abosheshe. Prior to the show's premier, Chumki says that her parents were unaware of her acting. From there, Chumki moved to films. Today, she continues doing television shows in addition to films and stage productions, as well as anchoring the program Amra Du'jon Dekhte Kemon telecast on Desh TV. She also writes scripts for teleplays.

On 28 January 2022, Chumki became a joint general secretary of the Actors Equity after receiving 500 votes.

Filmography

Films

Dramas

Books 

 Binita (Story) 2020

Awards
National Film Award
 Best Actress - Ghani (2006)
Meril Prothom Alo Awards
 Critics Choice Best Film Actress - Ekoi Britte (2013)

References

External links
 
 Naznin Hasan Chumki at the Bangla Movie Database

Living people
Year of birth missing (living people)
20th-century Bangladeshi actresses
Bangladeshi film actresses
Best Actress National Film Awards (Bangladesh) winners
21st-century Bangladeshi actresses
People from Chuadanga District
Bangladeshi screenwriters
Bangladeshi women film directors
Women screenwriters